Steens may refer to:

Steens, Mississippi, an unincorporated community
Steens Mountain, a fault-block mountain in southeast Oregon state

See also
Ron Steens (b. 1952), Dutch field hockey player
Steens Highway, Oregon Route 78